The 6th IAAF World Indoor Championships in Athletics were held at the Palais Omnisports de Paris-Bercy in Paris, France from March 7 to March 9, 1997. It was the first athletic championships to introduce women's pole vault. There were a total number of 712 participating athletes from 118 countries.

Results

Men
1993 | 1995 | 1997 | 1999 | 2001

Women
1993 | 1995 | 1997 | 1999 | 2001

 Mary Slaney of USA originally came second in the 1500 metre and was awarded the silver medal, but was later disqualified for doping.

Medal table

Participating nations

 (1)
 (1)
 (1)
 (4)
 (2)
 (1)
 (6)
 (10)
 (1)
 (7)
 (4)
 (10)
 (2)
 (2)
 (1)
 (1)
 (16)
 (4)
 (1)
 (1)
 (2)
 (8)
 (1)
 (1)
 (1)
 (18)
 (2)
 (1)
 (10)
 (2)
 (18)
 (7)
 (2)
 (1)
 (1)
 (2)
 (4)
 (6)
 (44)
 (1)
 (1)
 (34)
 (4)
 (40)
 (14)
 (1)
 (1)
 (14)
 (3)
 (8)
 (5)
 (25)
 (3)
 (17)
 (10)
 (4)
 (5)
 (2)
 (1)
 (4)
 (2)
 (1)
 (3)
 (1)
 (2)
 (1)
 (2)
 (2)
 (1)
 (1)
 (4)
 (2)
 (1)
 (2)
 (8)
 (5)
 (1)
 (4)
 (9)
 (10)
 (1)
 (1)
 (1)
 (1)
 (1)
 (12)
 (7)
 (1)
 (3)
 (1)
 (11)
 (42)
 (2)
 (1)
 (1)
 (1)
 (1)
 (2)
 (3)
 (7)
 (3)
 (1)
 (23)
 (1)
 (10)
 (5)
 (1)
 (1)
 (3)
 (1)
 (2)
 (1)
 (27)
 (54)
 (2)
 (4)
 (1)
 (1)
 (2)

See also
 1997 in athletics (track and field)

References

External links
IAAF 1997 World Indoor Championships Official Website (archived)
Athletics Australia

 
IAAF World Indoor Championships
IAAF World Indoor Championships
World Athletics Indoor Championships
International athletics competitions hosted by France
Athletics in Paris
IAAF World Indoor Championships
IAAF World Indoor Championships
International sports competitions hosted by Paris